Lyfe (stylized as Lyfë) is the sixth extended play by American rapper Yeat. It was released through Geffen Records, Field Trip and Twizzy Rich on September 9, 2022. The EP features a guest appearance from Lil Uzi Vert.

Background and promotion
On June 15, 2022, Yeat took to Twitter to announce the title of the EP. On September 2, 2022, he released the lead single, "Talk", a collaboration with American producer BNYX. Upon releasing the EP's single "Talk", Yeat confirmed on Instagram that his forthcoming EP would release the following week on September 9, 2022.

Commercial performance
Lyfe debuted at number ten on the US Billboard 200 with 30,000 sales in its first week, becoming Yeat's second top-ten project. The EP also accumulated a total of 42.08 million on-demand streams of the EP's songs during the tracking week.

Critical reception

In a positive review, Pitchfork praised Yeat's unique style and energy, and felt that it was one of his strongest efforts to date, writing: "Rage rap can be rote and exhausting, but in small doses—like on the Portland rapper's new pared-down and hypnotic album—the style can be ridiculous fun, electrifying, and hyperreal."

Track listing

Notes
 Any song title that contains the letter 'e' is replaced with 'ë'. For example, "Flawless" is stylized as "Flawlëss". If a song contains two or more 'e's, then only the last one is replaced.
 Only the first letter of each song title is capitalized. For example, "Out thë Way" is stylized as "Out thë way"

Personnel
 Rich Keller – mastering
 Noah Smith – mixing, recording

Charts

References

2022 EPs
Yeat albums
Geffen Records EPs